St. Anthony of Padua Church may refer to:

Asia 
 St. Anthony's Church, Tel Aviv, Israel
 Church of St. Anthony of Padua, Kokshetau, Kazakhstan
 Basilica of St. Anthony of Padua, Tonga

Philippines 
 San Antonio de Padua Parish Church, Philippines
 Saint Anthony of Padua Church (Barotac Nuevo, Iloilo), Philippines
 St. Anthony of Padua Parish Church (Camaligan), Camarines Sur, Philippines

India
 St. Antony of Padua Church, Sundampatti, Tamilnadu

Europe 
 Church of Saint Anthony of Padua, Sarajevo, Bosnia and Herzegovina
 Co-Cathedral of St. Anthony of Padua, Békéscsaba, Hungary
 Basilica of Saint Anthony of Padua, Italy
 Cathedral of St. Anthony of Padua, Lithuania
 Chapel of St Anthony of Padua, Fort Manoel, Malta
 St. Anthony of Padua Cathedral, Breda, Netherlands
 St. Anthony of Padua Church (Arad, Romania)
 Church of St. Anthony of Padua, Belgrade, Serbia
 St Anthony of Padua Church, Košice, Slovakia
 Church of St. Anthony of Padua, Istanbul, Turkey

Poland 
 Church of the Assumption of the Blessed Virgin and St Anthony of Padua, Poland
 Church of St. Anthony of Padua, Czerniaków, Poland
 St. Anthony's Church, Łódź-Łagiewniki, Poland
 St. Anthony of Padua Church, Strzelniki, Poland
 Church of St. Anthony of Padua, Warsaw, Poland

United Kingdom 
 St Anthony of Padua Church, Liverpool, United Kingdom
 St Anthony of Padua, Oxford, United Kingdom
 St Anthony of Padua Church, Rye, East Sussex, United Kingdom

North America

Canada 
 St. Anthony of Padua (Ottawa), Canada

United States of America 
 St. Anthony of Padua Parish (Fairfield, Connecticut), United States
 St. Anthony of Padua Parish, Chicopee, Massachusetts, United States
 St. Anthony of Padua Roman Catholic Church, New Jersey, United States
 St. Anthony's Church (Bronx), New York, United States
 St. Anthony of Padua Church (Bronx), New York, United States
 St. Anthony of Padua Church (Manhattan), New York, United States
 St. Anthony of Padua Church (New Bedford, Massachusetts), United States
 St. Anthony of Padua Catholic Church (Hoven, South Dakota), United States
 St Anthony of Padua Church, Washington D.C., United States

South America 
 St. Anthony of Padua Cathedral, Oberá, Argentina
 St. Anthony of Padua Cathedral, Patos de Minas, Brazil
 St. Anthony of Padua Church, Saül, French Guiana

See also 
 Anthony of Padua (1195–1231)